"Fire with Fire" is the first single taken from American pop band Scissor Sisters' third album, Night Work. It reached number 11 on the UK Singles Chart entered the top 40 in Austria and Ireland. The song is featured in the video game FIFA 11.

Music video
The music video was directed by Philip Andelman.

Production notes
 Artist: Scissor Sisters
 Song: Fire with Fire
 Label: Polydor UK
 Director: Philip Andelman
 Production company: Partizan
 Producer: Billy Parks
 Director of photography: Omer Ganai

Track listings
CD single
 "Fire with Fire" – 4:19
 "Invisible Light" (Siriusmo Remix) – 4:32

UK 12-inch vinyl
 "Fire with Fire" – 4:19
 "Fire with Fire" (Rory Philips Remix)
 "Fire with Fire" (a cappella)

UK iTunes EP
 "Fire with Fire" – 4:19
 "Fire with Fire" (Digital Dog Radio Remix) – 2:42
 "Invisible Light" (US 12") – 7:25

Official remixes
 "Fire with Fire" (album version) – 4:19
 "Fire with Fire" (Digital Dog Club Mix) – 5:30
 "Fire with Fire" (Rauhofer Reconstruction Mix) – 8:51
 "Fire with Fire" (Digital Dog Dub) – 6:16
 "Fire with Fire" (Digital Dog Radio Edit) – 2:42
 "Fire with Fire" (radio edit) – 3:41

Chart performance
"Fire with Fire" debuted on the Irish Singles Chart at number 25 on June 24, 2010. The single then rose nine places to its current peak of number 16 the following week. On July 9, 2010, the single fell eight places to number 24. The single also debuted at number 11 on the UK Singles Chart on June 27, 2010, marking Scissor Sisters' fourth-highest-charting single in that country. On its second week on the chart, the single fell a single place to number 12 despite the release of Night Work.

Weekly charts

Year-end charts

See also
 List of number-one dance singles of 2010 (U.S.)

References

External links
 "Fire with Fire" club promotion

Scissor Sisters songs
2010 singles
2010 songs
EMI Records singles
Music videos directed by Philip Andelman
Polydor Records singles
Song recordings produced by Stuart Price
Songs written by Babydaddy
Songs written by Jake Shears
Songs written by Stuart Price